Animal Farm is an upcoming British animated fantasy drama film directed by Andy Serkis, with a script written by Nicholas Stoller from a previous draft that was co-written by Rupert Wyatt and Serkis. Based on the novella of the same name by George Orwell, the adaptation is currently in production.

Production 

In July 2011, a feature film adaptation of Animal Farm was announced to be in development, with Rupert Wyatt serving as director. Wyatt and Andy Serkis were slated to serve as co-screenwriters. By October 2012, Serkis was announced to have taken over directorial duties, with the project being developed as a HFR-3D film. In August 2018, Netflix purchased distribution rights to the film. After numerous delays, Serkis once again began pre-production on the project, after completing his directing duties for Venom: Let There Be Carnage. 

By April 2022, it was announced that production had commenced as an animated film at Cinesite Studios, with a screenplay written by Nicholas Stoller. Serkis will also serve as producer, alongside Adam Nagle, Dave Rosenbaum, and Jonathan Cavendish. The project is a joint-venture production between Cinesite Studios, Aniventure, and The Imaginarium Productions, with Netflix dropping the distribution rights. In November 2022, Serkis stated that he couldn't return for the sequel to Venom: Let There Be Carnage due to being busy with Animal Farm.

The film was originally set to be shot with motion capture technology, later stop-motion was considered  before it was decided to make the film in traditional animation.

References

External links
 

Films based on Animal Farm
Films directed by Andy Serkis
British animated fantasy films
Upcoming films